P74 may refer to:

 , a submarine of the Royal Navy
 , a corvette of the Indian Navy
 Papyrus 74, a biblical manuscript
 Percival P.74, a British experimental helicopter
 P74, a state regional road in Latvia